Yehya Bundhun (born 25 January 1965) is a sportsperson from Mauritius. He competes in archery, a sport he took up at the age of 24. Prior to this he played volleyball, and his uncle Feizal Bundhun is a former national volleyball team coach.

At the 2004 Summer Olympics, Bundhun placed 64th in the men's individual ranking round with a 72-arrow score of 494.  Because of this, he faced the top-ranked South Korean archer Im Dong-hyun in the first elimination round. Bundhun lost this match 152-109, but his score in this round was enough to place him 63rd in the final ranking.

References

External links
 

1965 births
Living people
Mauritian male archers
Archers at the 2000 Summer Olympics
Archers at the 2004 Summer Olympics
Olympic archers of Mauritius